Streptomyces karpasiensis is a bacterium species from the genus of Streptomyces which has been isolated from soil from the Karpaz National Park in Magusa in Cyprus.

See also 
 List of Streptomyces species

References

Further reading

External links
Type strain of Streptomyces karpasiensis at BacDive -  the Bacterial Diversity Metadatabase	

karpasiensis
Bacteria described in 2014